Argyrotaenia unda is a species of moth of the family Tortricidae. It is found in Mexico (Morelos and the State of Mexico).

The length of the forewings is 9–10 mm for males and females. The forewings are rust to light copper, but rust brown apically. There is a silver-white longitudinal streak and a pale-brown line below this streak. The hindwings are white.

Etymology
The species name is derived from Latin unda (meaning wave).

References

U
Moths of Central America
Moths described in 2000